Florence Randolph may refer to:

Florence Hughes Randolph (1898–1971), American rodeo performer
Florence Spearing Randolph (1866–1951), American minister and suffragist